Vladimir Gevorkyan (born 14 December 1955 in Brest) is a Belarusian professional football coach and a former player of Armenian descent. In 2015, he worked as a head coach of Dnepr Mogilev.

Honours
Dinamo Brest (as coach)
Belarusian Cup winner: 2006–07

References

External links
 

Living people
1955 births
Soviet footballers
Belarusian footballers
FC Torpedo-BelAZ Zhodino players
Belarusian football managers
Belarusian expatriate football managers
Expatriate football managers in Poland
FC Dynamo Brest managers
FC Belshina Bobruisk managers
FC Partizan Minsk managers
FC Dnepr Mogilev managers
Belarusian people of Armenian descent
Sportspeople from Brest, Belarus
Association football midfielders